The 2001 Open Championship was a men's major golf championship and the 130th Open Championship, held from 19 to 22 July at Royal Lytham & St Annes Golf Club in Lytham St Annes, England. David Duval won his only major championship, three strokes ahead of runner-up Niclas Fasth.

Course layout
Royal Lytham & St Annes Golf Club

Previous lengths of the course for The Open Championship (since 1950):

Past champions in the field

Made the cut

Missed the cut

Source:

Round summaries

First round
Thursday, 19 July 2001

Second round
Friday, 20 July 2001

Amateurs: Dixon (−1), Wilson (+5), Hoey (+7), Quinney (+7), Griffiths (+8), Kemp (+12).

Third round
Saturday, 21 July 2001

Final round
Sunday, 22 July 2001

Amateurs: Dixon (+1)
Source:

Scorecard
Final round

Cumulative tournament scores, relative to par
Source:

References

External links
Royal Lytham & St Annes 2001 (Official site)
130th Open Championship - Royal Lytham & St Annes (European Tour)

The Open Championship
Golf tournaments in England
Open Championship
Open Championship
Open Championship